Natalie Smith may refer to:
 Natalie Smith (sport shooter)
 Natalie Smith (actress)

See also
 Natalie Smith Henry, American artist